NA-162 Bahawalnagar-III is a constituency for the National Assembly of Pakistan.

Election 2002 

General elections were held on 10 Oct 2002. Mian Abdul Sattar Khan of PML-Q won by 58,836 votes.

Election 2008 

General elections were held on 18 Feb 2008. Abdul Ghafoor Chaudhry of PPP won by 77,664 votes.

Election 2013 

General elections were held on 11 May 2013. Tahir Bashir Cheema of PML-N won by 83,353 votes and became the  member of National Assembly.

Election 2018 

General elections are scheduled to be held on 25 July 2018.

See also
NA-161 Bahawalnagar-II
NA-163 Bahawalnagar-IV

References

External links 
Election result's official website

NA-190